SAT1 may refer to:

 Sat.1, a German television station
 SAT1 (gene) (spermidine/spermine N1-acetyltransferase 1), a human gene